Brigadier Kenneth Ocen Obwot, is a Ugandan physician, military officer and medical administrator in  the Uganda People's Defence Forces (UPDF). He serves as the Deputy Director of Medical Services in the UPDF.

Background and education
He was born in the Acholi sub-region of the Northern Region of Uganda circa 1954. After attending local elementary and secondary schools, he was admitted to Makerere University, Uganda's oldest and largest public university in 1974. He entered Makerere University School of Medicine, graduating with a Bachelor of Medicine  and Bachelor of Surgery degree, in 1979. In 1990, he obtained a Master  of Medicine in Internal Medicine, also from Makerere University.

In 1996, he was admitted to the Cardiff University School of Medicine (at that time University of Wales College of Medicine), where he graduated with a Diploma in Dermatology. The following year he obtained a Master of Science degree in Dermatology. Later, in 2000, he successfully studied for a Postgraduate Diploma in Health Management, from the same university. He specialized in dermatology (skin diseases).

Career
Dr Ocen Obwot, when on military duty, is based at Bombo Military Hospital, in Luweero District. In February 2019, as part of a promotions exercise that involved 2,031 UPDF men and women, Dr. Kenneth Ocen Obwot was promoted from the rank of colonel to that of brigadier general.

See also
 Stephen Kusasira
 Magid Kagimu
 Thomas Aisu
 Churchill Lukwiya Onen

References

External links
 Who is who? List of UPDF top brass and what they do As of 27 November 2014.

Living people
1954 births
Acholi people
Ugandan military doctors
Ugandan dermatologists
Makerere University alumni
Alumni of Cardiff University
People from Northern Region, Uganda
Ugandan generals